James Henry Clarke (27 March 1921 – 8 November 2015) was an English footballer who scored 49 goals from 91 appearances in the Football League playing for Darlington (in three spells), Leeds United and Hartlepools United in the years following the Second World War. Clarke was born in Darlington. A centre forward, he also played non-league football for clubs including Stanley United and Stockton. He also played Minor Counties cricket for Durham. Clarke died in 2015 at the age of 94.

References

External links
 2006 feature in The Northern Echo, with photograph

1921 births
2015 deaths
Footballers from Darlington
English footballers
Association football forwards
Stanley United F.C. players
Darlington F.C. players
Leeds United F.C. players
Hartlepool United F.C. players
Stockton F.C. players
English Football League players
English cricketers
Durham cricketers